Caloreas tacubayella is a moth in the family Choreutidae. It was described by William D. Kearfott in 1908. It is found in Mexico.

References

Choreutidae
Moths described in 1908